Yang Jiechi (born 1 May 1950) is a Chinese senior diplomat and politician who served as Director of the Office of the Central Foreign Affairs Commission, highest diplomatic position in the country, between 2013 and 2022. He also served as a member of the Politburo of the Chinese Communist Party between 2017 and 2022.

Yang spent much of his professional life in the United States, where he was the Chinese Ambassador from 2001 to 2005. He served as the Foreign Minister of China between 2007 and 2013. Since 2013, he has been the secretary-general, later renamed director of the Office of the Central Foreign Affairs Leading Group, later renamed the Central Foreign Affairs Commission. He is generally regarded as one of the foremost contemporary architects of China's foreign policy.

He joined the inner circle of the State Council in 2013, as a State Councilor under Chinese Premier Li Keqiang.

Early life and education
Yang was born in Shanghai on 1 May 1950. In 1963, Yang Jiechi was admitted to the Shanghai Foreign Language School. Affected by the Cultural Revolution, he dropped out of school in 1968 and entered Shanghai Pujiang Electric Meter Factory as a worker. During the four years in the factory, he still insisted on learning English and maintained his foreign language proficiency. After President Nixon visited China in 1972, Zhou Enlai instructed that China should accelerate the training of new foreign language talents to meet the needs of the development of the international situation. In 1972 and 1973, the Chinese Ministry of Foreign Affairs selected more than 130 people. Yang was selected. He graduated from Shanghai Foreign Language School and attended the Ealing College, University of Bath and the London School of Economics from 1973 to 1975. From 2001 to 2006, He received a PhD in World History from Nanjing University through distance education while serving as Chinese ambassador to the United States.

Career

He was previously a diplomat in the United States, beginning as a Second Secretary in 1983 and later as Ambassador from 2001 to 2005, and as Vice Minister of Foreign Affairs responsible for Latin America and Hong Kong, Macau, and Taiwan.  During the Tiananmen Square Protests of 1989, Yang accompanied Wan Li, the chairman of the National People's Congress, on a trip to North America.

During his tenure as ambassador to the United States, Yang worked to ease the tensions between the two countries following the 2001 mid-air collision between a U.S. EP-3 spy plane and a Chinese fighter jet off the coast of Hainan Island in the South China Sea.

In April 2007, Yang replaced Li Zhaoxing, who had been China's foreign minister since 2003, as the tenth foreign minister of China.

In July 2010, at the ASEAN Ministers Conference in Hanoi, Yang, responding to remarks by U.S. Secretary of State Hillary Clinton on freedom of navigation in the South China Sea, called the remarks "an attack on China" and told Singapore's Minister for Foreign Affairs George Yeo that "China is a big country and other countries are small countries, and that's just a fact."; however, Yang issued a statement on the Foreign Ministry's Web site saying that there was no need to internationalize the issue, that China was still intent on solving all of the disputes bilaterally. 

In a meeting with Australia's foreign minister Bob Carr, Yang criticized the decision to put US Marines in Australia's Northern Territory by stating to Carr "Cold War alliances" were out of date, to which Carr "reminded Yang that Chinese leaders like to relate the story of the Ming dynasty admiral Zheng He who took powerful Chinese fleets as far afield as India and Arabia but sought to occupy no lands".

In 2013, Yang Jiechi met with Japan's new ambassador to China and leader of Japan's New Komeito party. Yang also held group meetings with ambassadors from EU and its member states. He also met with Moo-sung Kim, Special envoy of South Korea's president-elect Park Geun-hye, to strengthen ties with South Korea. Yang has also made pledges for more contribution to world peace.

At the first plenary session of the 12th National People's Congress in March 2013, Yang Jiechi was elected as State Councilor.

Yang was a member of the 18th Central Committee of the Chinese Communist Party. He was also a member of the 17th CCP Central Committee and an alternate member of the  16th CCP Central Committee.
He was elevated to the decision making Politburo at the 19th CCP Congress in October 2017.

In 2019, Yang was described as "the most senior Chinese official to attend [the] Munich Security Conference since it began in 1963." He gave a keynote address.

Alaska Summit 

In March 2021, Yang led the Chinese delegation for a strategic dialogue with the US in Alaska. The US team was headed by the Secretary of State Antony Blinken, in the first interaction with China during the Biden Administration. In the opening session in the presence of media, after 2-minute opening remarks by Blinken, Yang responded with an unexpected 16-minute speech. He said that it was necessitated by the "tone" of the US delegation. He harangued the United States for its human rights record, called it a global "champion of cyber attacks", and declared that "many people within the United States actually have little confidence in the democracy of the United States".

These remarks went viral in China and Yang was praised for his forthrightness. The Washington Post said that the Biden Administration gets a taste of China's "wolf warrior" diplomacy. Although these statements were criticized as undiplomatic by Americans, they were reportedly popular and widely praised in China.

Zurich Summit 
In October 2021, Yang travelled to Zürich, Switzerland to meet with U.S. National Security Advisor Jake Sullivan to further discuss current issues regarding diplomatic relations and a possible virtual meeting between U.S. President Joe Biden and Chinese President Xi Jinping. The virtual summit between the leaders eventually happened on 16 November 2021.

Honors
Yang Jiechi received an honorary degree from the Geneva School of Diplomacy in 2009. It was announced by the President of Pakistan on 14 August 2012 that Hilal-i-Pakistan (Crescent of Pakistan) would be given to Yang Jiechi on 23 March 2013.

Nickname
George H. W. Bush said Yang Jiechi's other name is "Tiger Yang", because Yang Jiechi was born in 1950, the year of the Tiger according to the Chinese zodiac, and because his name, "Chi" contains a variant of "Hu" (虎, Tiger).

Family 
Yang is married to Le Aimei. Yang's daughter,  Alice Yang, graduated from Yale.

See also
Foreign policy of Xi Jinping
Xi Jinping Thought on Diplomacy
Central Foreign Affairs Commission

Notes

References

External links 

 Biography of Yang Jiechi, Xinhuanet.
 
 
 

|-

Foreign Ministers of the People's Republic of China
1950 births
Living people
Members of the 19th Politburo of the Chinese Communist Party
Ambassadors of China to the United States
Nanjing University alumni
Alumni of the London School of Economics
Alumni of the University of Bath
Chinese Communist Party politicians from Shanghai
People's Republic of China politicians from Shanghai
20th-century Chinese politicians
21st-century Chinese politicians
Honorary Fellows of the London School of Economics
State councillors of China
Recipients of Hilal-i-Pakistan